KGLP (91.7 FM) is a National Public Radio-affiliated radio station in Gallup, New Mexico. The station's programming includes a mix of local shows and National Public Radio programming. The station broadcasts from the University of New Mexico branch campus in Gallup.

The station was assigned the KGLP call letters by the Federal Communications Commission on June 14, 1991.

See also
List of community radio stations in the United States

References

External links
 KGLP official website

GLP
NPR member stations
University of New Mexico
Radio stations established in 1991
1991 establishments in New Mexico
Community radio stations in the United States